The following is the list of squads for each of the 10 clubs competing in the 2011 FIBA Asia Champions Cup, held in Pasig, Philippines between May 28 to June 5, 2011. Final squads are subject to the approval of the event's technical committee. Each club has 15 players for the competition including a prerogative to tap two imports for their teams. A number of former National Basketball Association players and draftees such as Samaki Walker, Marcus Douthit, and Loren Woods, to name a few, will compete in the tournament.

Group A

Al-Ittihad Jeddah

Head coach:  Ninad Krazdic

ASU Sports

Head coach:  Fredrick Onigga

KL Dragons

Head coach:  Ariel Vanguardia

Smart Gilas

Head coach:  Rajko Toroman

References

External links
 2011 FIBA Asia Champions Cup homepage
 2011 FIBA Asia Champions Cup teams

2011